Marie-Renée Ucciani (March 27, 1883 – February 19, 1963) was a French painter and sculptor. A member of the Société des Artistes Français, she exhibited in its Salon in the 1930s.

Biography
Marie-Renée Ucciani was born in the 3rd arrondissement of Paris, March 27, 1883. Her mother, Hortense (née Bégard), was an heiress and the manager of an important jeweler and goldsmith business, "Bégard H. et Cie".

In May 1903, she married Georges Baudy (1880-1960), who took over the business, "Bégard H. et Cie" on February 8, 1911. Their youngest daughter died at the age of two following a fall in the Tuileries Garden, which destabilized the marriage. Ucciani divorced and tried to forget this tragedy by painting and sculpting.

Ucciani was introduced to painting at a very young age by her father. From 1906, she painted in Villers-sur-Mer in the company of Léon Giran-Max, her cousin , and her father, in a style influenced by Post-Impressionism and Fauvism.

From 1913 to 1914, Ucciani was introduced to sculpture by Paolo Troubetzkoy before his departure to the United States. She took her family, her friends, and her dog "Loute" as models. The Bénet couple became friends and stayed at her home, Villa Corsica in Villers-sur-Mer. In 1932, she became a member of the Société des Artistes Français and exhibited in its Salon from that year to 1939.

From 1940 to 1944, she lived in Villers-sur-Mer, in the evacuated zone, in spite of pressure from family and friends. From 1945 to 1963, living in Paris in an artist's studio at 63, boulevard Berthier, she returned to paint every spring on the Normandy coast.

She died on February 19, 1963, in her studio in the 17th arrondissement of Paris, and was buried in the Bégard family chapel in the Père Lachaise Cemetery in Paris.

Gallery

References

Bibliography
 Dutour, Françoise; Egnell, Karin, Villers et ses peintres (1858-1930), (catalogue d'exposition), Imprimerie Moderne de Bayeux, 2014.
 Egnell, Karin, Ucciani à Villers, Le Pays d'Auge (société savante), October 2012 
 Egnell, Karin, Eugène Bénet et le Poilu victorieux, Le Pays d'Auge (société savante), November–December 2014 
 Giansily, Pierre-Claude, Histoire de la peinture en Corse aux XIXe et XXe siècles. Dictionnaire des peintres, June 2010 
 Nigaglioni, Michel-Édouard, Encyclopédie des Peintres actifs en Corse, Éditions Alain Piazzola, 2013 
 Catalogue illustré du Salon des artistes français, 1933
 L'art de vivre à Villers au XIXe et XXe siècle, Ouest-France (Pays d'Auge), 18 June 2014 
 Peintres du Pays d'Auge, Journées du Patrimoine, Le Pays d'Auge et Ouest-France (Pays d'Auge), September 2010 
 Villers et ses peintres (évènement), Ouest-France (Pays d'Auge), 12 June 2014 

1883 births
1963 deaths
20th-century French painters
20th-century French sculptors
Painters from Paris
Burials at Père Lachaise Cemetery
Sculptors from Paris
20th-century French women artists
French women painters
French women sculptors